USS LST-973 was an  in the United States Navy. Like many of her class, she was not named and is properly referred to by her hull designation.

Construction
LST-973 was laid down on 25 November 1944, at Hingham, Massachusetts, by the Bethlehem-Hingham Shipyard; launched on 27 December 1944; and commissioned on 27 January 1945.

Service history
Following World War II, LST-973 performed occupation duty in the Far East until early February 1946. She was decommissioned on 24 May 1946, and transferred to the US Army. The ship was struck from the Navy list on 29 September 1947, but reinstated on 6 September 1950, for service during the Korean War. Decommissioned again on 7 November 1951, LST-973 was transferred to the French Navy that same date. She was struck from the Navy list for the second time on 20 November 1951.

Awards
LST-973 earned four battle stars one award of the Navy Unit Commendation for Korean service.

Notes

Citations

Bibliography 

Online resources

External links
 

 

LST-542-class tank landing ships
World War II amphibious warfare vessels of the United States
Ships built in Hingham, Massachusetts
1944 ships